Dame Katharine Annis Calder Gillie DBE ERCP (Lond) FRCGP (3 August 1900 in London – 10 April 1985 in Bledington, Oxfordshire) was a British physician and medical researcher. She was President of the Royal College of General Practitioners and the first woman serving as vice-chair of the British Medical Association (BMA). The third BMA committee on general practice was set up in 1961 under Gillie and was charged with guiding the general practice in Great Britain.

Biography

Gillie was the eldest among four children of Dr. Robert Calder Gillie, a minister in the Presbyterian Church of England, and Emily (née Japp) Gillie. She studied at Wycombe Abbey, University College London and University College Hospital, graduating in 1925. In 1927, she became member of the Royal College of Physicians. She started working as assistant to a medical partnership of three women, and after they retired continued receiving patients at her home in Connaught Square in London. During World War II she moved with her two children to a country cottage at Pangbourne, continuing her medical work until retirement in 1963.

Gillie was noted for helping recover British general practice after World War II. She was a member of the General Medical Council (1946–1948) and president of the Medical Women's Federation (1954–1955). 

She was also a member of the Medical Practices Committee, Executive Council of London, Standing Medical Advisory Committee, Central Health Services Advisory Council, BMA central ethical committee, and BMA council (1950–1964). Beginning in 1968, and for several years, she served as BMA vice-chairman, becoming the first woman in that position.

She was a founder member of the College of General Practitioners and was chairman (1959–1962). In 1961–63, she chaired a sub-committee set up by the Standing Medical Advisory Committee to guide the development of general practice in Britain. Earlier in 1964 she was elected as fellow of the Royal College of General Practitioners.

Awards and honours
Gillie received the Order of the British Empire (OBE) in 1961, and promoted to Dame Commander of the Order of the British Empire (DBE) in 1968. That same year she was awarded an honorary MD degree by the Edinburgh University.

Personal life
In 1930, Gillie married Peter Chandler Smith, an architect. He lost his practice during the war and was unfit for military service. Later he became chronically ill with multiple sclerosis and depended much on Gillie, who also provided most incomes for the family. Dr. Gillie died on 10 April 1985, aged 84, at her home in Bledington, Oxfordshire, two years after her husband's death.

References

Sources
 The Field of Work of the Family Doctor (The Gillie Report), Central Health Services Council, Standing Medical Advisory Committee.  London: 1963.

1900 births
1985 deaths
20th-century English medical doctors
British general practitioners
Fellows of the Royal College of General Practitioners
English women medical doctors
Dames Commander of the Order of the British Empire
British medical researchers
Presidents of the Medical Women's Federation
People from Bledington
20th-century women physicians
20th-century English women
20th-century English people
People educated at Wycombe Abbey
Alumni of University College London